Jorge Félix may refer to:

 Jorge Félix (Brazilian footballer) (born 1940), Brazilian football midfielder
 Jorge Félix (Spanish footballer) (born 1991), Spanish football winger